Pontus Aspgren (born 15 March 1991) is a speedway rider from Sweden.

Speedway career
He rode in the top tier of British Speedway for the Wolverhampton Wolves during the 2012 Elite League speedway season. He made his 2017 Speedway European Championship debut in 2017.

In 2022, he helped Smederna win the Swedish Speedway Team Championship during the 2022 campaign despite missing the majority of the season after sustaining a back injury in April.

References 

1991 births
Living people
Swedish speedway riders
Leicester Lions riders
Rye House Rockets riders
Somerset Rebels riders
Wolverhampton Wolves riders